Clement Parker (31 December 1926 – 6 November 2017) was a New Zealand sprinter.

At the 1950 British Empire Games he won the bronze medal as part of the men's 4 x 110 yard relay alongside Kevin Beardsley, Arthur Eustace and Peter Henderson. He also competed in the 100 and 200 yards where he placed 6th in each of the finals.

His sister Dorothea Parker also won a medal at the 1950 British Empire Games.

References 
Athletes at the Games by John Clark, page 97 (1998, Athletics New Zealand) 

1926 births
2017 deaths
New Zealand male sprinters
Commonwealth Games bronze medallists for New Zealand
Athletes (track and field) at the 1950 British Empire Games
Commonwealth Games medallists in athletics
Sportspeople from Hastings, New Zealand
Medallists at the 1950 British Empire Games